Two Rooms: Celebrating the Songs of Elton John & Bernie Taupin is a 1991 tribute album consisting of interpretations of sixteen songs written by Elton John and Bernie Taupin. The title refers to a song on John's album 21 at 33, "Two Rooms at the End of the World", and to the duo's unusual collaborative style; it is also the title of a 1991 film documenting their collaboration.

Critical reception
The album gained an uneven reception, though some performances were singled out for praise, including Sinéad O'Connor's interpretation of "Sacrifice", Kate Bush's reggae-inflected version of "Rocket Man", which in 2007 won The Observer readers' award for Greatest Cover of all time, and Tina Turner's Grammy-nominated version of "The Bitch Is Back".

Singles
Two singles were released from the album: Oleta Adams' version of "Don't Let the Sun Go Down on Me" peaked at number 33 in the UK Singles Chart and Kate Bush's "Rocket Man" peaked at number 12 in the UK and number two in Australia. Wilson Phillips' cover of "Daniel", while not released as a single, peaked at number seven in the US Adult Contemporary chart due to strong radio airplay.

Kate Bush
Kate Bush's reggae-inflected version of "Rocket Man" was released as a single and peaked at number 12 in the UK and number two in Australia (where it beat the original version's chart position by several places). In 2007, the track won The Observer readers' award for Greatest Cover of all time.

"I was really knocked out to be asked to be involved with this project," Bush said, "because I was such a big fan of Elton's when I was little. I really loved his stuff. It's like he's my biggest hero, really. And when I was just starting to write songs, he was the only songwriter I knew of that played the piano and sang and wrote songs. So he was very much my idol, and one of my favourite songs of his was 'Rocket Man'. Now, if I had known then that I would have been asked to be involved in this project, I would have just died… They basically said, 'Would we like to be involved?' I could choose which track I wanted… 'Rocket Man' was my favourite. And I hoped it hadn't gone, actually – I hoped no one else was going to do it… I actually haven't heard the original for a very long time. 'A long, long time' (laughs). It was just that I wanted to do it differently. I do think that if you cover records, you should try and make them different. It's like remaking movies: you've got to try and give it something that makes it worth re-releasing. And the reggae treatment just seemed to happen, really. I just tried to put the chords together on the piano, and it just seemed to want to take off in the choruses. So we gave it the reggae treatment. It's even more extraordinary (that the song was a hit) because we actually recorded the track over two years ago. Probably just after my last telly appearance. We were quite astounded when they wanted to release it as a single just recently."

The B-side of Bush's single was her version of "Candle in the Wind". The CD single added an instrumental version of the same song.

Track listing

Charts

Weekly charts

Year-end charts

Certifications

See also

Revamp & Restoration

References

Elton John tribute albums
1991 compilation albums
Polydor Records compilation albums
Rock compilation albums